A bruise is a type of hematoma caused by trauma.

Bruise or Bruises may also refer to:
 Bruise (album), by Assemblage 23, released 2012
Bruises (Cary Brothers album), released 2018  
"Bruises", a song by Chairlift from their 2008 album Does You Inspire You
 "Bruises" (Lewis Capaldi song), released 2017
 "Bruises" (Train song), released 2012
 Bruised (film), an American sports film

See also
 
 
 Bruise Brothers (disambiguation)
 Bruiser (disambiguation)
 Cerebral contusion, a bruise of the brain tissue
 Ecchymosis, a type of purpura, not necessarily caused by trauma
 Stone bruise, a painful foot condition
 Stone bruise (horse), a hoof injury